Peta is a feminine given name. Notable individual with this name include:

People

Women
 Peta Bala'c (born 1953), English football goalkeeper
 Peta Brady (born 1972), Australian actress
 Peta Buscombe, Baroness Buscombe (born 1954), English barrister and politician
 Peta Credlin (born c. 1970), Australian political adviser and Chief of Staff
 Peta Edebone (born 1969), Australian softball player and Olympic medalist
 Peta Gallagher (born 1977), Australian field hockey striker
 Peta Hewitt, creator of the web and print comic Terinu
 Peta Lily (Peta Wilhelmina Gottschalk), London-based physical theatre performer and director
 Peta Lindsay (born 1984), American anti-war activist
 Peta Murgatroyd (born 1986), New Zealand/Australian professional dancer
 Peta Murray, Australian writer
 Peta Rutter (1959–2010) New Zealand actress
 Peta Scholz (born 1976), Australian netball player
 Peta Seaton (born 1959), former Australian politician
 Peta Sergeant, Australian actress
 Peta Stephens (born 1978), Australian netball player
 Peta Taylor (1912–1989), English cricketer
 Peta Todd (born 1986), English glamour model
 Peta Toppano (born 1951), British-born Australian actress born Peita Toppano
 Peta Verco (born 1956), Australian cricketer
 Peta Wilson (born 1970), Australian actress and model
 Peta García Daroca (born 2001), Agentinian singer and teacher

Men
 Peta Hiku (born 1992), New Zealand rugby league player
 Peta Nocona (1820-1864?), a chief of the Comanche band Noconi
 Peta Teanet, South African disco musician

Fictional characters
 Peta Janossi, in the Australian soap opera Home and Away
 Peta (MÄR), a fictional character in the manga and anime series MÄR

Animals
Peta (cat), former resident Downing Street cat and unofficial Chief Mouser to the Cabinet Office (1964-78)

See also
 Peta-Gaye Dowdie, a Jamaican international sprinter 
 Peta-Gaye Gayle, Jamaican track and field sprinter
 Peta-Kaye Croft, Australian politician

Feminine given names